Upper Cormorant Lake is a ground water-seepage freshwater lake with no inflow or outflow that is located south of the Audubon Township in Becker County. The lake is part of the Cormorant Lakes group.

References

External links 

 Upper Cormorant Lake Association

Lakes of Becker County, Minnesota
Lakes of Minnesota